"Beauty of the Ride" is a song by Sebadoh from their 1996 album Harmacy.  It was released as a CD Single, a 7" vinyl record, and a 10" vinyl record.

The song peaked at number 74 on the UK Singles chart.

Track listing
UK/GE 7" Single (RUG47)
"Beauty of the Ride (Combination mix)" 
"Riding" (Palace Brothers cover)

UK/GE 10" and CD Single (RUG47CD)
"Beauty of the Ride (Combination mix)" 
 "Sixteen"
"Riding" (Palace Brothers cover)
 "Slintstrumental"

Sebadoh songs
1996 singles
Songs written by Lou Barlow
1996 songs
Domino Recording Company singles